Tara Brown (born 14 March 1968 in Sydney, New South Wales) is an Australian television presenter and reporter.

Early life and career
Brown attended Charles Sturt University in Bathurst, New South Wales, graduating in 1989 with a Bachelor of Arts (Communication) Degree.

After graduation, she joined Channel Seven's Sydney newsroom as an assistant to the chief-of-staff. In 1991, Brown moved to WIN Television in Wollongong , and undertook a cadetship in journalism.

Nine Network
In 1992, she joined the Nine Network and began working on compiling features including "Australian Agenda" reports for the Nine Network's late news programme Nightline.  In 1993 she left  Nightline and began reporting on A Current Affair. Her most memorable stories for A Current Affair include a series of reports on a group of Australian soldiers returning to Vietnam on the 20th anniversary of the fall of Saigon; uncovering a tyre dumping racket which posed a major environmental threat; and a feature story on refugees in Bei Hai in southern China.

In 2001, she became a reporter on the Nine Network's 60 Minutes programme. The first person Brown ever interviewed on 60 Minutes was Mel Gibson.

Brown was previously a fill-in presenter for Nine Sunday AM News.

In April 2016, Brown and eight other people (including three other staff members of the Nine Network, David Ballment, Stephen Rice, and Ben Williamson) were arrested on allegations of child abduction in Lebanon. Lebanese judicial sources told The Guardian that the group were to be charged with "armed abduction, purveying threats and physical harm" - crimes which carry sentences of twenty years' imprisonment with hard labour. She was released from custody only after the Nine Network paid a substantial money settlement to the father of the children, the subject of the attempted abduction.

Personal life
Brown was married to TV producer John McAvoy from 2000 until their divorce in 2017. She has two sons, born in 2008 and 2010.

References

1968 births
Living people
Australian television presenters
Australian women television presenters
Australian people imprisoned abroad
People from Sydney
People educated at Davidson High School
Prisoners and detainees of Lebanon
Charles Sturt University alumni
60 Minutes (Australian TV program) correspondents